Form 5 is  an SEC filing submitted to the Securities and Exchange Commission on an annual basis by company officers, directors, or beneficial (10%) owners, which summarizes their insider trading activities. This form is simply a combination of year's Form 4 filings, which are mandatory filings made shortly after insiders make transactions.

External links
 SEC Homepage

SEC filings